The Philippine International Convention Center (or PICC) is a convention center located in the Cultural Center of the Philippines Complex in Pasay, Metro Manila, Philippines. The facility has been the host of numerous local and foreign conventions, meetings, fairs, and social events.

The PICC served as the office of the Vice President of the Philippines until 2005. It also previously housed the Philippine Charity Sweepstakes Office.

History 
In 1974, then President Ferdinand Marcos signed the Presidential Decree No. 520 which authorized the Central Bank of the Philippines (now Bangko Sentral ng Pilipinas) to construct an international conference building, acquire a suitable area for that purpose, and organize a corporation to manage a conference center. Thus, the PICC was organized under the Corporation Code. 

This was a part of Marcos' efforts to make Metro Manila as one of Southeast Asia's financial centers. The PICC building, along with other buildings in the Cultural Center of the Philippines complex, has been associated with what has been termed Imelda Marcos' "edifice complex," which one writer defined as "obsession and compulsion to build edifices as a hallmark of greatness or as a signifier of national prosperity."

The construction of the PICC Complex was undertaken in a short span of 23 months, from November 1974 to September 1976, with Leandro Locsin as architect, who was subsequently named a National Artist.

On September 5, 1976, the PICC, Asia's first international convention center was officially inaugurated when it hosted the 1976 IMF-World Bank Meeting.

From its inception to the present, the PICC has also hosted the annual Awards Night of the Filipino Academy of Movie Arts and Sciences (FAMAS), the Philippine-equivalent of the Academy Awards, mostly at its Plenary Hall.

Presidential Decree No. 995 created the Batasang Bayan to function as a legislative body before the Interim Batasang Pambansa convened in 1978. So on September 21, 1976, on 4th founding anniversary of the Bagong Lipunan (New Society), the Batasang Bayan held its inauguration at the PICC. For the first time, the PICC was used to house a legislative body from 1976 to 1978.

The PICC was the venue of the World Chess Olympiad and the Miss Universe in 1994, the APEC meeting in 1996, and the 3rd Informal Summit of the ASEAN in 1999.

Renovation work of the PICC was completed in 1996, which took around seven months for the APEC Meeting after the aging structure has been neglected since 1985. Renovations were headed by Raul Locsin, the cousin of the original architect of the facility. The endeavour was funded by the facility's owner, the Bangko Sentral ng Pilipinas.

In March 2011, Bro. Bo Sanchez, the founder of Light of Jesus Family, transferred "The Feast" from Valle Verde Country Club, Pasig to PICC. The Feast PICC has an attendance of 3,000 at the Plenary and Reception Halls combined. Similarly, PICC was a venue of the Kerygma Conference (now Feast Conference) in November 2013 and November 2014.

On November 18–19, 2015, the PICC hosted the APEC Economic Leaders' Meeting. On April 29, 2017, the PICC hosted the 30th ASEAN Summit. It was the site of protests on November 11, 2017, against the arrival of U.S. President Donald Trump.

On December 4–9, 2019, the PICC Forum became the venue for the sport of boxing at the 2019 Southeast Asian Games.

Architecture and design

The Philippine International Convention Center is composed of five building modules: the Delegation Building, Secretariat Building, Plenary Hall, Reception Hall and The Forum.

APEC Sculpture Garden

The APEC Sculpture Garden is located in the right, left and front lawns of the PICC. It was jointly organized by the Department of Foreign Affairs and the National Commission for Culture and the Arts, the curator of the garden, in commemoration of the APEC Philippines 1996. The garden is composed of 20 unique sculptures made by artists from their respective APEC countries. Each sculpture embodies the collective ideals of the 20 APEC member economies. The countries that donated their sculptures to the garden include Australia, Brunei Darussalam, Canada, Chile, Chinese Taipei, Hong Kong, Indonesia, Japan, Malaysia, Mexico, New Zealand, Philippines, Papua New Guinea, People's Republic of China, Republic of Korea, Russian Federation, Singapore, Thailand, United States and Vietnam. As of 2017, only Peru has yet to donate a sculpture to the garden.

References

External links

Philippine International Convention Center Official Website
Gallery at Leandro V. Locsin Partners

Convention and exhibition centers in Metro Manila
Buildings and structures in Pasay
Buildings and structures completed in 1976
1976 establishments in the Philippines
Leandro Locsin buildings
Brutalist architecture in the Philippines
Modernist architecture in the Philippines